William Wayne Brown (27 February 1886 – 14 June 1958) was an American racecar driver who participated in the 1919 Indianapolis 500.

Biography
He was born on February 27, 1886, in Dodge City, Kansas.

The ascent took 5 hours and 28 minutes.

He participated in the 1919 Indianapolis 500.

He died on June 14, 1958, in Kansas City, Missouri.

Indy 500 results

References

External links
W. W. Brown  images

1886 births
1958 deaths
Indianapolis 500 drivers
People from Dodge City, Kansas
Racing drivers from Kansas
AAA Championship Car drivers
Hillclimbing